Karan Johar (born Rahul Kumar Johar; 25 May 1972), often informally referred to as KJo in the Hindi Film Industry, is an Indian filmmaker and television personality, who primarily works in Hindi cinema. He has launched the careers of several successful actors under his own Dharma Productions. The recipient of several accolades, including a National Film Award and six Filmfare Awards, he has been honored with Padma Shri, the country's fourth highest civilian award by the Government of India in 2020.

Son of producer Yash Johar, he made his directorial debut with the romantic comedy-drama Kuch Kuch Hota Hai (1998), which earned him the National Film Award for Best Popular Film Providing Wholesome Entertainment, the Filmfare Award for Best Director and [Best Screenplay]]. His next films, the ensemble family drama Kabhi Khushi Kabhie Gham... (2001) and the ensemble musical romantic drama Kabhi Alvida Naa Kehna (2006), were both major critical and commercial successes in both domestic and overseas markets. His social drama My Name Is Khan (2010) earned him his second Filmfare Award for Best Director. Johar produced the spy thriller Raazi (2018) and the biopic Shershaah (2021), both of which won him the Filmfare Award for Best Film. These, along with other films he has produced under the Dharma Productions banner, have established him as one of the leading director-producers in Hindi cinema.

Johar has also ventured into other avenues of the entertainment industry. He hosts a television talk show, Koffee with Karan, Season 7 of this show is currently airing on Hotstar,<ref>{{Cite web |date=2022-08-09 |title=Karan Johar on Koffee With Karan: Never thought I would get this far, hosting seven seasons'-Entertainment News , Firstpost |url=https://www.firstpost.com/entertainment/karan-johar-on-koffee-with-karan-never-thought-i-would-get-this-far-hosting-seven-seasons-11031561.html |access-date=2022-08-09 |website=Firstpost |language=en}}</ref> a dating show What the Love! and a radio show Calling Karan, and appeared as a judge on competition reality shows Jhalak Dikhhla Jaa, India's Got Talent, India's Next Superstars.

 Early and personal life 
Johar was born on 25 May 1972 in Mumbai, India to film producer Yash Johar, founder of Dharma Productions and Hiroo Johar. He has Punjabi Hindu ancestry from his father's side, and Sindhi Hindu ancestry from his mother's side. He studied at the Greenlawns High School. After Greenlawns, he attended H.R. College of Commerce and Economics, both in Mumbai. His maternal uncles were filmmakers Yash and B. R. Chopra. His maternal first cousins are Uday and Aditya Chopra.

Johar started his career in the entertainment industry as an actor, when he played the role of Shrikant in the 1989 Doordarshan serial Indradhanush. As a child, he was influenced by commercial Indian cinema: He cites Raj Kapoor, Yash Chopra and Sooraj R. Barjatya as his inspirations. For a time, Johar followed numerology, creating film titles in which the first word and a number of others in the title began with the letter K. After watching the 2006 film, Lage Raho Munna Bhai which was critical of numerology, Johar decided to stop this practice.

Discussing his sexual orientation, Johar said "Everybody knows what my sexual orientation is. I don't need to scream it out. If I need to spell it out, I won't only because I live in a country where I could possibly be jailed for saying this". In February 2017, Johar became father to twins (a boy and a girl) through surrogacy. The twins were born at Masrani Hospital in Mumbai. Johar named his son Yash after his father, and his daughter Roohi named by rearranging his mother's name Hiroo.

 Film career 
 Director 
Johar entered the film industry as an assistant director on cousin Aditya Chopra's Dilwale Dulhania Le Jayenge (1995), which is regarded as a landmark in Hindi cinema. He then made his own directorial debut with the romantic comedy-drama Kuch Kuch Hota Hai (1998). The first half of the film centers on a college love triangle between an insensitive boy (Shah Rukh Khan), his tomboyish best friend (Kajol), and the prettiest girl at the college (Rani Mukerji), while the second half centers on the now-widowed boy's attempt to reconnect with his best friend who is now engaged to marry a businessman (Salman Khan). The film became a major blockbuster at the box office and received positive reviews from critics. Writing for Planet Bollywood, critic Anish Khanna commented that "Johar makes an impressive directorial debut, has a good script sense, and knows how to make a film with S-T-Y-L-E." It won the National Film Award for Best Popular Film Providing Wholesome Entertainment. It swept most of the major awards at the 44th Filmfare Awards, including Best Film, Best Director, and all four acting awards.

Johar's next directorial venture was the ensemble family drama Kabhi Khushi Kabhie Gham... (2001). The film starred Amitabh Bachchan as an egotistical rich industrialist, Jaya Bachchan as his compassionate wife, and Shah Rukh Khan and Hrithik Roshan as their two sons. It also featured Kajol and Kareena Kapoor as sisters from a lower-class family who become the love interests of Khan and Roshan respectively. The film became Johar's second major blockbuster at the box office and received positive reviews from critics. Critic Taran Adarsh commented that Johar "confirms the fact that he is the brightest in film firmament. The premise [of the film] is simple, but it is the storytelling that deserves the highest marks."

Johar's third directorial venture was the ensemble musical romantic drama Kabhi Alvida Naa Kehna (2006), which dealt with the controversial subject of marital infidelity and dysfunctional relationships set against the backdrop of non-resident Indians (NRIs) living in New York City. The film's plot follows a washed-up athlete (Shah Rukh Khan), whose frustration with his wife (Preity Zinta) results in an extramarital affair with a family friend (Rani Mukherji), a schoolteacher who is also unhappy with her marriage to her childhood friend (Abhishek Bachchan). The film emerged as Johar's third consecutive major blockbuster at the Indian box office and an even larger success in the overseas markets. It received highly positive reviews from critics who praised Johar's departure from the directorial style of his first two films. Rajeev Masand wrote, "Few writers have such solid control over their screenplay as Johar does. Few understand the intricacies of narrative as well as he does. Johar goes from highs to lows, from plateaus to peaks with the ease of a pro. He knows exactly how to turn a seemingly ordinary scene into something special with just that one line of dialogue, or that hint of background music." The script of the film which was co-written by Johar received recognition by a number of critics and was invited to be included in the library of the Academy of Motion Picture Arts and Sciences.

Johar's fourth directorial venture was the social drama My Name Is Khan (2010), his first film not written by him. The plot follows a Muslim man with Asperger's syndrome and his Hindu wife, played by Shah Rukh Khan and Kajol, who live in San Francisco and face racial prejudice after 11 September attacks. The film became Johar's fourth consecutive major blockbuster  in both domestic and overseas markets, and received rave reviews from critics who praised Johar's unconventional directorial style. Critic Subhash K. Jha wrote that the film "is a flawless work, as perfect in content, tone, and treatment as any film can get." The film won Johar his second Filmfare Award for Best Director.

For his next feature film Student of the Year (2012), Johar chose not to cast established actors for his lead roles and instead recruited three debutante actors (Sidharth Malhotra, Alia Bhatt and Varun Dhawan). The plot revolved around the quest of a group of students who are all gunning for the title of "Student of the Year" at their college. The film was a moderate commercial success and received mixed reviews from critics. Some called it "supremely entertaining and enjoyable," while others called it "a film which suffers from the lack-of-a-story syndrome."

Johar then teamed up with Zoya Akhtar, Anurag Kashyap, and Dibakar Banerjee for Bombay Talkies (2013), an anthology film released to celebrate the centenary year of Hindi cinema. Each of the directors made one short film to contribute to the large anthology. The plot of Johar's film followed a magazine editor (Rani Mukerji) who discovers that her husband (Randeep Hooda) is gay after an interaction with an intern at her office (Saqib Saleem). The film did not perform well at the box office, but earned positive reviews from critics.

Johar's next directorial venture was the musical romantic drama Ae Dil Hai Mushkil (2016). The film featured Ranbir Kapoor as a man dealing with an unrequited love for his best friend, played by Anushka Sharma. It also featured Aishwarya Rai Bachchan as an older woman who engages in a brief relationship with Kapoor's character, and Fawad Khan as the love interest of Sharma's character. The film emerged as a major blockbuster at the box office and received mixed-to-positive reviews from critics, who called it "Johar's most grown-up film yet."

Johar teamed up again with Zoya Akhtar, Anurag Kashyap, and Dibakar Banerjee for Lust Stories (2018), an anthology film released on Netflix that served as a follow-up to Bombay Talkies. The film was praised for its exploration of female sexuality, a subject rarely dealt with in Indian films. Johar's segment revolved around a newly married schoolteacher (Kiara Advani) whose husband (Vicky Kaushal) fails to recognize her lack of sexual satisfaction.

In August 2018, Johar took to Twitter to announce his next film Takht, a period drama based in the Mughal era, which will feature an ensemble star cast including Ranveer Singh, Kareena Kapoor, Bhatt, Vicky Kaushal, Bhumi Pednekar, Janhvi Kapoor and Anil Kapoor. With a screenplay by Sumit Roy, dialogues by Hussain Haidry & music composed by A. R. Rahman, this will be the second film directed by Johar that he has not written himself. In an interview with Firstpost, Johar stated that Takht would begin filming in September 2019.

In July 2021, it was announced that Johar would direct a love story called Rocky Aur Rani Ki Prem Kahani. The film is expected to release in 2023 and will star Dharmendra, Jaya Bachchan, Shabana Azmi, Singh and Bhatt in the lead roles.

 Producer 

Johar's directorial work (with the exception of anthology films Bombay Talkies, Lust Stories and Ghost Stories) has been produced under the Dharma Productions banner, founded by his father Yash Johar and taken over by him after his father's death in 2004. In addition to his own directorial work, he has produced several films by other directors under the Dharma banner. Many of these films have become major critical and commercial successes including Kal Ho Naa Ho (2003), Dostana (2008), Wake Up Sid (2009), I Hate Luv Storys (2010), Agneepath (2012), Yeh Jawaani Hai Deewani (2013), 2 States (2014), Humpty Sharma Ki Dulhania (2014), Kapoor & Sons (2016), Dear Zindagi (2016), Badrinath Ki Dulhania (2017), Raazi (2018), Simmba (2018), Kesari (2019), Good Newwz (2019), Sooryavanshi (2021), Jugjugg Jeeyo (2022) and Brahmāstra: Part One – Shiva (2022).

 Other work 
In addition to working as an assistant director on Dilwale Dulhania Le Jayenge (1995), Johar was an actor in the film, playing the minor role of a friend of Shah Rukh Khan’s character. Since then, he has made cameo appearances playing himself in films like Om Shanti Om (2007), Fashion (2008), and Luck by Chance (2009).

He made his full-fledged acting debut alongside Ranbir Kapoor and Anushka Sharma in Anurag Kashyap’s period drama Bombay Velvet (2015), in which he played the main antagonist. Although the film did not perform well at the box office, Johar earned some appreciation for his performance. Critic Sarita A. Tanwar commented, "The only consolation in the film is Karan Johar who brings a lot of dignity to the character of Khambatta... which is commendable since this is totally outside his comfort space."

Johar has worked as a costume designer for Shah Rukh Khan on many films like Dilwale Dulhania Le Jayenge (1995), Dil To Pagal Hai (1997), Duplicate (1998), Mohabbatein (2000), Main Hoon Na (2004), Veer-Zaara (2004), and Om Shanti Om (2007).

Johar is the host of Koffee with Karan, a talk show where he interviews actors, directors, producers, and other prominent members of the Hindi film industry. The series has run intermittently since 2004, with seven seasons . Since 2012, he has served as a judge on the reality shows Jhalak Dikhhla Jaa (with Madhuri Dixit and Remo D’Souza), India's Got Talent (with Malaika Arora Khan, Kirron Kher, and Farah Khan) and India's Next Superstars (with Rohit Shetty). In January 2022, he appeared as a judge on the Colors TV's show Hunarbaaz: Desh Ki Shaan along with Mithun Chakraborty and Parineeti Chopra.

Johar is also an investor in an AI led adtech influencer marketing platform Kofluence. The company had raised a pre-series funding of $4 Million as of 8th February 2022.  

 Filmography 
 Film 

 Acting roles 

 Television 

 Awards and honours 

 Criticism 

The death of Sushant Singh Rajput sparked a debate on nepotism in the Hindi film industry. Johar was one of the personalities who were targeted by the late actor's fans for allegedly encouraging nepotism by casting children of established Bollywood stars in his films instead of outsider talents. Johar was first accused of this by Kangana Ranaut on Koffee With Karan''. however, various members of the industry came to his defence.  A complaint was filed against Johar "for abetting" Rajput's suicide.

Johar has responded to the nepotism allegations, saying that his production house has introduced 21 debut directors, "out of which, I can say, 16-17 are not 'nepotistic' young filmmakers. They are not from the fraternity or the industry. They are completely from outside." Regarding his casting insiders, Johar said, "Why do they discredit some of the actors who are from (the industry)? I think they are talented enough to face the camera and maybe, one thing can say is that they get easy access, but after that, they have got a journey ahead."

Bibliography

References 
Siddharth Malhotra and Kiara Advani at Bollywood Hungama

External links 

 
 

1972 births
Male actors in Hindi cinema
Hindi-language film directors
Indian costume designers
Indian male film actors
Film producers from Mumbai
Indian television talk show hosts
Living people
Film directors from Mumbai
Punjabi people
Sindhi people
Indian Hindus
Punjabi Hindus
Indian people of Sindhi descent
Filmfare Awards winners
Screen Awards winners
Zee Cine Awards winners
International Indian Film Academy Awards winners
21st-century Indian male actors
21st-century Indian designers
21st-century Indian film directors
Directors who won the Best Popular Film Providing Wholesome Entertainment National Film Award
Recipients of the Padma Shri in arts
LGBT film directors
Indian LGBT entertainers
LGBT television directors
LGBT fashion designers
Indian LGBT screenwriters
Indian LGBT actors
LGBT producers